
Gmina Czarna Dąbrówka is a rural gmina (administrative district) in Bytów County, Pomeranian Voivodeship, in northern Poland.

The gmina contains part of the protected area called Słupia Valley Landscape Park.

Villages
Gmina Czarna Dąbrówka contains the villages and settlements of Będzieszyn, Bochówko, Bochowo, Brzezinka, Ceromin, Cole, Czarna Dąbrówka, Czarnolesie, Dąbie, Dąbrowa Leśna, Dęby, Drążkowo, Flisów, Gliśnica, Jasień, Jaszewo, Jerzkowice, Kartkowo, Karwno, Kleszczyniec, Kłosy, Kostroga, Kotuszewo, Kozin, Kozy, Lipieniec, Łupawsko, Mikorowo, Mydlita, Nowe Karwno, Nożynko, Nożyno, Obrowo, Osowskie, Otnoga, Owsianka, Podkomorki, Podkomorzyce, Połupino, Przybin, Przylaski, Rokiciny, Rokicki Dwór, Rokitki, Rokity, Rudka, Skotawsko, Soszyce, Święchowo, Unichowo, Wargówko, Wargowo and Zawiaty.

Neighbouring gminas
Gmina Czarna Dąbrówka is bordered by the gminas of Borzytuchom, Bytów, Cewice, Dębnica Kaszubska, Parchowo, Potęgowo and Sierakowice.

References
Polish official population figures 2006

Czarna Dabrowka
Bytów County